Romanworld is the debut album by American garage house producer Romanthony. It was released by Azuli Records on March 17, 1997. It is a double album of mostly previously released work, with some new mixes of these songs.

Track listing 
CD

Both discs are continuous without any track markings.

Vinyl

The vinyl release has an identical tracklist to the CD release, but the first half is on sides C and D and the second half is on sides A and B. Due to the limits of the vinyl format, some of the tracks fade out early.

References

External links
 

Romanthony albums
1997 debut albums